WCBT (1230 AM) is a sports radio station licensed to Roanoke Rapids, North Carolina, serving Roanoke Rapids and Halifax in North Carolina and Emporia in Virginia.  WCBT is owned and operated by Jimmy Johnson, through licensee Johnson Broadcast Ventures, Ltd.

History
On November 13, 1948, fire destroyed the studios and offices of WCBT.  With only one turntable salvaged from the studio building, the station had to operate from its transmitter building.  Limited space there meant that live talent had to perform outdoors.  Ministers who conducted morning devotions drove their cars to the transmitter building and broadcast from the cars.

On September 27, 2013, First Media Radio reached a deal to sell WCBT to Johnson Broadcast Ventures for $100.000.  The sale was consummated on December 19, 2013.  Upon the sale's completion, the station dropped ESPN Radio for a music format featuring Classic Rhythm and Blues, Gospel, and Southern Soul formatted broadcasts.

In 2016, WCBT returned to a sports radio format, changing their name to SportsRadio 1230 WCBT The Ticket. WCBT airs programming from NBC Sports Radio and SB Nation Radio and features Sports USA Radio Network college football and NFL games as well as the Tar Heel Sports Radio Network football and men's basketball games.

Past personalities
 Jesse Helms, news director (late 1940s)
 Wayne Harris (1951–52) nighttime deejay
 "Cousin Slick" (Roy Gray, Jr.), country DJ (1950s-1960s)
 Wayne Harris (1961–62) morning drive/news director
Russ Barrett (1970s-1990), morning drive
Allen Garrett (1996-2004)Program Director
Brian Lewis (1984-1990), afternoon drive
Wayne Lewis (1978-1990)
Greg Thompson (1986-1990), midday
Robert Spragins (through the early-mid 80s), News and Sports Announcer
Connie Beckleman (1981-1985), Afternoon Drive
Sam Medlin (1986-1990), Evenings/Weekends
Dan Tanner (1985-1989), News Announcer
Rick O'Bryant (1988-1990)

References

External links

1940 establishments in North Carolina
Sports radio stations in the United States
Radio stations established in 1940
CBT